View of Egmond aan Zee (c. 1650s) is an oil on canvas painting by the Dutch landscape painter Jacob van Ruisdael.
It is an example of Dutch Golden Age painting and is now in the collection of the Nationalmuseum in Stockholm.

This painting was documented by Hofstede de Groot in 1911, who wrote; 

This scene is very similar to other paintings Ruisdael made of Egmond aan Zee and these were perhaps popular because the townsfolk already knew that erosion was threatening their village and had moved their homes and businesses further inland. The choir of the church was already in ruins and the tower was in use as a beacon for ships. Storms had steadily eroded the coast since a major flood in 1570, and in the 18th century the village as it is depicted here definitely disappeared in the waves. As a ghost town it was something of an early tourist attraction. Today the modern town is also threatened, as the coast is still eroding further eastwards.

References 

View of Egmond aan Zee in the Rijksbureau voor Kunsthistorische Documentatie (RKD), the Netherlands Institute for Art History

1650s paintings
Paintings by Jacob van Ruisdael
Paintings in the collection of the Nationalmuseum Stockholm